The 2000–01 Austrian Cup was the 67th season of Austria's nationwide football cup competition. It commenced with the matches of the First Round in August 2000 and concluded with the Final on 27 May 2001. The competition was won by FC Kärnten after beating Tirol Innsbruck 2–1 after extra time and hence qualifying for the 2001–02 UEFA Cup.

First round

| colspan="3" style="background:#fcc;"|

|-
| colspan="3" style="background:#fcc;"|

|-
| colspan="3" style="background:#fcc;"|

|-
| colspan="3" style="background:#fcc;"|

|-
| colspan="3" style="background:#fcc;"|

|-
| colspan="3" style="background:#fcc;"|

|-
| colspan="3" style="background:#fcc;"|

|-
| colspan="3" style="background:#fcc;"|

|-
| colspan="3" style="background:#fcc;"|

|}

Second round

Third round

Fourth round

Quarter-finals

Semi-finals

Final

Details

References

External links
 Austrian Cup 2000-2001
 RSSSF page

Austrian Cup seasons
2000–01 in Austrian football
Austrian Cup, 2000-01